Maccioni is a surname. Notable people with the surname include:

 Antonio Machoni or Antonio Maccioni (1671–1753), an Italian jesuit, linguist and cartographer.
 Giovanni Battista Maccioni (floruit 1651–1674), Italian composer, and librettist
 Pierre-Henry Maccioni (born 1948), a French prefect.
 Sirio Maccioni (born 1932 in Montecatini Terme, Italy), a restaurateur and author.
 Sonia Maccioni (born 1966), an Italian athletics champions in women’s marathon.

Surnames of Italian origin

de:Maccioni